Seč is an abandoned settlement in the Municipality of Kočevje in southern Slovenia. It was a village inhabited by Gottschee Germans. In 1941, during the Second World War its original population was expelled. The area is part of the traditional region of Lower Carniola and is now included in the Southeast Slovenia Statistical Region.

Church

The local church is dedicated to Saint Agnes and was built in 1837. Its interior furnishings were destroyed after the Second World War. It was restored in the early 1980s.

References

External links

Seč on Geopedia
Pre–World War II List of oeconyms and family names in Seč

Populated places in the Municipality of Kočevje